Ivan Sergeyevich Podrebinkin (born July 3, 1993) is a Russian volleyball player, a member of the club Belogorie.

Sporting achievements

National Team 
FIVB Men's U23 World Championship:
  2015

References

External links
VCZenit-SPB profile
NOVA-Klub profile
Volley Service profile
Volleybox profile

1993 births
Living people
Russian men's volleyball players
VC Zenit Saint Petersburg players
VC Belogorie players